The G class were a class of diesel locomotives built by English Electric, Rocklea for the Midland Railway of Western Australia in 1963. They were later sold to the Western Australian Government Railways.

History
The G class was a class of diesel-electric locomotives based upon the British Rail Class 20, with a cab similar to the Jamaican Railways Class 81 and its Australian derivatives. The two members of the class entered service with the Midland Railway of Western Australia in May 1963 after being shipped from Rocklea. They entered service on the Midland to Watheroo line.

Together with the rest of the company's assets and operations, they were taken over by the Western Australian Government Railways in 1964. In their later years they operated out of Bunbury and Perth.

Disposal
G51 was withdrawn from service in May 1990, and scrapped in January 1991.

G50 was withdrawn in March 1991 and preserved by the Australian Railway Historical Society. As of 2014, it is on loan to the Hotham Valley Railway.

References

Further reading

Co-Co locomotives
English Electric locomotives
Diesel locomotives of Western Australia
Railway locomotives introduced in 1963
3 ft 6 in gauge locomotives of Australia
Diesel-electric locomotives of Australia